April Morning is a 1961 novel by Howard Fast, about Adam Cooper's coming of age during the Battle of Lexington. One critic notes that in the beginning of the novel he is "dressed down by his father, Moses, misunderstood by his mother, Sarah, and plagued by his brother, Levi." In the backdrop are the peaceful people of Lexington, forced "to go into a way of war that they abhorred."

While the novel was not originally written as a young adult story, it has increasingly been assigned in middle school English and social studies classes, due to the age of the protagonist and Fast's meticulous efforts to recreate the texture of daily life in colonial America and the political currents on the eve of the American Revolution.

In 1988, a film version was made for television starring Chad Lowe as Adam and Tommy Lee Jones as Moses.

Plot
The novel begins in the afternoon of April 18, 1775, when Adam's father, Moses, sends him out to draw water from the well for his mother, Sarah. After completing this task, he heads upstairs to talk with Granny. During it, they engage in a debate on religion. Afterwards, they head downstairs for dinner. Then they pray and the meal, consisting of bread pudding and donkers, begins. In the middle of it, Moses confronts Adam about a "spell" to be said while drawing water. As a result, the confrontation starts an argument, which is interrupted by Cousin Simmons arriving. He, chosen to draft a letter on the rights of man, comes to Moses with his draft seeking criticism. Another debate arises over his description of rights as "god-given." Moses asserts that rights come from the people backing them, not God.

After dinner is over and Adam finishes some evening chores, he heads over to the Simmons' house to meet with Ruth, his love interest, and go on a walk. Before he is able to see her, however, Aunt Simmons makes conversation with him and feeds him pie. Then Ruth comes downstairs, and she and Adam leave on a walk. During it, they talk about various things, including their futures and what they want to be in the world. After a kiss he walks her home and then he himself heads home. Upon arrival, he spots his brother, Levi, cleaning his gun. He does not like this but Sarah insists that he let him do it. Then he heads upstairs and goes to bed. Before falling asleep he overhears his parents talking about the committee meeting. Finally he falls asleep.

Suddenly, Adam is awakened by Levi, who draws attention to a speedy rider that stops in the center of town. Now all the Coopers are awake and curious. People gather around the rider on the green, who informs them that the British are coming and may be marching through their town. He then rides off. Because of this news, arguments stir in the crowd on whether to muster the militia. The people of Lexington agree to muster it. Adam signs up and is then tasked to take Ruth home. After doing so, he comes home to overhear his parents designating him a man. As he walks in Moses chastises him. He then has him load his gun and go to the muster.

After Adam and all the other men arrive at the green, the militia muster falls into order and the women and children are sent inside. They stand there for a few hours until the redcoats march into town. The British fix bayonets, then fire upon the militia. Moses falls and Adam runs away. He hides in a smokehouse until Levi comes in. Levi tells him to leave town because the British are searching. He leaves, jumps over a wall, and meets Solomon Chandler. He feeds and comforts Adam on the events he just witnessed. Then they walk until they meet Cousin Dover, Cousin Simmons, and the Reverend. They continue to walk until they arrive at the militia encampment. There the militia plans several ambushes and Adam shares his story of the massacre on the Lexington green. Then the militia sends a horseman to scout ahead while the others lie in wait by the road. He returns, then the British come. The militia releases a few volleys before retreating over the hill. The militia, not pursued by the British, stop to rest and plan the next ambush.

During the next ambush Adam falls asleep under some brush. He is awakened by Cousin Simmons and the Reverend searching for his body and talking about him. He calls to them, to their relief, and they send him home. He returns home and is greeted by Levi, who walks him into the house. It is occupied by mourners, Ruth, Granny, and Sarah. The latter sends him to get Moses a coffin and take it to the church. After a brief conversation with the coffin-maker he returns home. He eats dinner, then Sarah sends him to light candles by Moses' coffin. Ruth accompanies him and they talk for a while, until he walks her home. Then he himself goes home and to bed.

Themes 
Several major themes arise in the novel. Although the most common theme picked up on is coming of age, several others have been noted. These others are non-violence, the rights of man, and the truth.

The first theme, coming of age, deals with Adam's becoming a man during the Battle of Lexington. After Moses is killed on the green, Adam is thrust into manhood. Vomiting and sobbing after the battle, he then returns home to be treated as the man of the house, against his wishes.

The theme of nonviolence is based on Moses' belief in solving problems through arguments, rather than warfare. This theme is also supported by Adam's later saying "I don't hate anyone enough to kill him." The rights of man appears several times through Moses' speeches. Also, the colonists are drafting a statement on the rights of man to send to Boston.

For the truth theme, several conflicts have been noted in the first chapter, such as Moses' talking against superstition yet birching Adam seven times.

Background 
York has said that Fast's view on the revolution (that aligns with his political beliefs) is exhibited in the novel. He says "[Fast] believed the essence of the revolution was with the faceless and nameless people who fought it." Also, The New York Times says that "[Fast] proposes that Solomon Chandler organized the Battle of Lexington.

Reception 
The novel received many positive reviews. Hunter praised Fast for writing it for "demonstrat[ing] a more mature vision." Desrosiers agreed, saying that April Morning "[is] a well written work which knits together the events of the 19th of April 1775." Macdonald also praised Fast for "A virtually perfect relationship between literary character and research."

Adaptations
The novel was adapted for TV in the Hallmark Hall of Fame in 1988 by James Lee Barrett. It was directed by Delbert Mann. It stars Chad Lowe as Adam and Tommy Lee Jones as Moses. Although it is set at the very beginning of the American Revolution it is more about Adam's journey to manhood and his relationship with his parents.

Publication information
April Morning, by Howard Fast. Originally published 1961. Mass Market Paperback: Bantam, 1983.

See also
 List of films about the American Revolution
 List of television series and miniseries about the American Revolution

References

Novels by Howard Fast
American historical novels
Novels set during the American Revolutionary War
American young adult novels
Works about children in war
1961 American novels
Fiction set in 1775
Lexington, Massachusetts
Novels set in one day
Novels set in the 1770s